Jakub Konečný (born 19 June 2002) is a Czech professional ice hockey centre for HC Sparta Praha of the Czech Extraliga.

Playing career
Konečný made his professional debut for HC Sparta Praha during the 2021–22 season. He was drafted in the seventh round, 216th overall, by the Buffalo Sabres in the 2020 NHL Entry Draft.

International play
Konečný played for the Czech Republic at the 2022 World Junior Ice Hockey Championships.

Career statistics

References

External links
 

2002 births
Living people
Buffalo Sabres draft picks
Czech ice hockey forwards
HC Baník Sokolov players
HC Karlovy Vary players
HC Stadion Litoměřice players
Ice hockey people from Brno